The 2009 season was Lillestrøm SK's 20th season in the Tippeligaen, and their 36th consecutive season in the top division of Norwegian football.

Pre-season and friendlies

The first pre-season friendly was scheduled on January 15 vs Nybergsund IL.

References 

2010
Norwegian football clubs 2010 season